Jesús Tolentino Román Bojórquez (born 10 September 1956) is a Mexican politician affiliated with the PRI. As of 2013 he served as Deputy of the LXII Legislature of the Mexican Congress representing the State of Mexico.

References

1956 births
Living people
Politicians from Sinaloa
Members of the Chamber of Deputies (Mexico)
Institutional Revolutionary Party politicians
21st-century Mexican politicians
National Autonomous University of Mexico alumni
Deputies of the LXII Legislature of Mexico